Pritchard Englefield, a long-established medium-sized commercial law firm in the City of London, merged with Thomas Eggar LLP on 1 May 2013,  another long-established law firm with origins in Sussex, operating out of offices in London, Sussex,  Berkshire and Hampshire, and headquartered in Crawley. Subsequently, in 2016 Thomas Eggar merged with Irwin Mitchell LLP, another long-established law firm with origins in Sheffield. This took the number of Irwin Mitchell offices nationally to 17: in London the merged offices operate from 40 Holborn Viaduct.

Pritchard Englefield was based in the city from the date of its foundation in 1848 by HD Pritchard, initially at Painters Hall, where Mr Pritchard and his partner Mr Englefield became Joint Clerks to the Painter Stainers Company, and finally in New Street, just off Bishopsgate although the firm located to the West End of London for a period (1971-1992). The 165th anniversary of the firm fell in 2013, just before the merger.

After World War II, the firm grew by merger and bolt-on.  It was guided by managing partners such as A.D. Englefield and Julian Tobin, and enriched by German-speaking émigré lawyers from Central Europe from the 1930s, including Rudolf Graupner and Hans Marcus. It was the first UK law firm to enter Germany after World War II, opening an office in Hamburg (1946) and Frankfurt (1990), while alliances were also formed in Hong Kong and Guernsey.

Practice
Pritchard Englefield became particularly well known for its UK and European commercial law practice and an insurance arm, acting for European insurance companies.  Fluency in German and French, and dual-qualified German lawyers, came to characterise the practice. Fluency in either French or German also became a requirement for trainee solicitors on recruitment.

The firm's main practice areas focused on corporate and commercial law, intellectual property, banking law, property law, commercial litigation and arbitration, product liability, employment law, conflicts of law, pensions, personal injury, family law, and international private clients.

Pritchard Englefield also formed part of the PLG and ILG, loose groupings of independent international law firms.

References

Law firms based in London
Law firms of the United Kingdom
Law firms established in 1848
1848 establishments in England
British companies established in 1848